Claude DeBruhl (January 5, 1915 – September 4, 1982) was an American politician. He served as a Democratic member for the 43rd and 45th district of the North Carolina House of Representatives.

Life and career 
DeBruhl was born in Madison County, North Carolina, the son of Levasta Reece and William LeRoy DeBruhl. He attended Woodfin High School, the University of North Carolina at Asheville, Lenoir–Rhyne University and Love Law School.

In 1969, DeBruhl was elected to represent the 45th district of the North Carolina House of Representatives, serving until 1973. In the same year, he was elected to represent the 43rd district.

DeBruhl died in September 1982, at the age of 67.

References 

1917 births
1982 deaths
People from Madison County, North Carolina
Democratic Party members of the North Carolina House of Representatives
20th-century American politicians
University of North Carolina at Asheville alumni
Lenoir–Rhyne University alumni

1915 births